| tries = {{#expr:
 + 1 + 0 + 2 + 1 + 2 + 5 + 5 + 3 + 4
 + 6 + 7 + 7 + 3 + 6 + 3 + 2 + 6 + 9
 + 1 + 8 + 6 + 2 + 1 + 4 + 1 + 5 + 0
 + 3 + 3 + 3 + 4 + 8 + 4 + 6 + 3 + 3
 + 4 + 2 + 3 + 0 + 4 + 5 + 3 + 3 + 6
 + 3 + 2 + 4 + 2 + 1 + 7 + 5 + 6 + 4
 + 4 + 2 + 2 + 2 + 2 + 2 + 5 + 6 + 4
 + 7 + 1 + 2 + 8 + 3 + 3 + 4 + 4 + 4
 + 1 + 5 + 8 + 7 + 5 + 2 + 2 + 3 + 8
 + 4 + 5 + 5 + 4 + 4 + 6 + 2 + 8 + 7
}}
| top point scorer = Felipe Contepomi (Leinster)James Hook (Ospreys)(161 points)
| top try scorer = Thom Evans (Glasgow)(9 tries)
| website = www.rabodirectpro12.com
| prevseason = 2007–08
| nextseason = 2009–10
}}
The 2008–09 Celtic League (known as the 2008–09 Magners League for sponsorship reasons) was the eighth Celtic League season and the third with Magners as title sponsor. The season began in September 2008 and ended in May 2009. Ten teams played each other on a home-and-away basis, with teams earning four points for a win, and a bonus point for scoring four or more tries in a match. Losing teams also earned a bonus point if they lost by seven points or less.

The ten competing teams consisted of the four Irish provinces, Munster, Leinster, Connacht and Ulster; two Scottish regions, Edinburgh Rugby and Glasgow Warriors; and four Welsh regions, Cardiff Blues, Newport Gwent Dragons, Ospreys and Scarlets. The Scarlets were originally known as the "Llanelli Scarlets", but renamed themselves at the start of the season, in order to reflect their regional identity.

Munster were crowned champions on 30 April 2009 after the Ospreys beat the Newport Gwent Dragons 27–18 but failed to claim a bonus point.

Teams

Table

Results

Round 1

Welsh Round 1
 All-Welsh Round 5 matches played mid-week to allow Welsh teams to play in the Anglo-Welsh Cup.

Round 2

Round 3

Round 4

Round 5

Round 6

Round 7

Welsh Round 2
 All-Welsh Round 6 matches played mid-week to allow Welsh teams to play in the Anglo-Welsh Cup.

Round 8

1872 Cup 1st round

Round 9

1872 Cup 2nd round

Round 10

Round 11

Round 12

Round 13

Round 14

Round 15

Round 16

Rearranged fixtures
 Round 13 match rescheduled to allow Ospreys to play in the Anglo-Welsh Cup semi-final.

 Round 15 match rescheduled to allow Cardiff Blues to play in the Anglo-Welsh Cup final.

Round 17

Rearranged fixture
 Round 13 match rescheduled to allow Cardiff Blues to play in the Anglo-Welsh Cup semi-final.

Round 18

Leading scorers
Note: Flags to the left of player names indicate national team as has been defined under IRB eligibility rules, or primary nationality for players who have not yet earned international senior caps. Players may hold one or more non-IRB nationalities.

Top points scorers

Top try scorers

Broadcast rights
Television rights for the league are split between three broadcasters, BBC Wales, S4C and Setanta Sports. BBC Wales and S4C continues to cover the Pro12.

Notes

References

 
2008-09
 
2008–09 in Irish rugby union
2008–09 in Welsh rugby union
2008–09 in Scottish rugby union